The 1972–73 IHL season was the 28th season of the International Hockey League, a North American minor professional league. Nine teams participated in the regular season, and the Fort Wayne Komets won the Turner Cup.

Regular season

Turner Cup Playoffs

External links
 Season 1972/73 on hockeydb.com 

IHL
International Hockey League (1945–2001) seasons